Aberdeen Royal Infirmary is the largest hospital in the Grampian area, located on the Foresterhill site in Aberdeen, Scotland. ARI is a teaching hospital with around 900 inpatient beds, offering tertiary care for a population of over 600,000 across the north of Scotland. It offers all medical specialities with the exception of heart and liver transplants. It is managed by NHS Grampian.

History
The hospital has it origins in a facility established at Woolmanhill in 1739. The move to the current site formed part of the Aberdeen Joint Hospitals Scheme as envisaged by Professor Matthew Hay, which involved the development of an integrated medical campus at Foresterhill. The granite buildings on the site were designed by James Brown Nicol. The hospital was officially opened by the Duke and Duchess of York on 23 September 1936 – King Edward VIII had been due to open the infirmary but he called off his visit and instead went to Ballater railway station to meet Wallis Simpson off her train. The first patients were admitted a month later and the hospital joined the National Health Service in 1948.

In 1984, a hyperbaric oxygen unit was built for the treatment of decompression illness and the hospital's in vitro fertilisation unit achieved a number of successful pregnancies in 1985, its first year of operation.

In 1986, a new £550,000 out-patient eye clinic opened, offering corrective laser eye surgery, and in 1989, the hospital introduced a breast cancer screening service for women over the age of 50, with X-rays taken every three years.

In the 1980s John Mallard led a team which built the first whole body MRI scanner. The world's first whole-body MRI scanner was used for diagnostic imaging between 1980 and 1983. The prototype machine, Mark One was put on display in the hospital's art gallery, the Suttie Arts Space, in February 2016. Following fundraising by Evening Express readers, in 1992 a Siemens scanner, costing £870,000 was brought.

In 2013, a £110m emergency care centre development was completed. This was the first time that the Foresterhill campus had hosted emergency and urgent care facilities in the same building, and 75% of the beds in the centre are single-occupancy.

In February 2014, it was revealed that the hospital has a repairs backlog of £60 million. On 26 June 2014, Finance Secretary John Swinney announced a £120 million investment for a new cancer centre and maternity hospital on the site.

In 2016, it became one of four major trauma centres as part of a national major trauma network in Scotland.

Services
There are social workers that can be contacted in the hospital, and a citizens advice office. The hospital is served by the volunteer-run radio station, Grampian Hospital Radio.

Transportation
The complex is served by several bus services with regular connections to the city centre and service to places as far as Inverurie and Oldmeldrum in the north, Inverness in the West and Cove Bay in the south.

A new multistorey carpark with space for over 1,000 cars was opened in 2017.

Research
There are close links with the University of Aberdeen's medical school and there has been pioneering research in many fields, including the development of MRI and PET scanning. A new PET scanner was installed in 2006.

It has been one of the centres evaluating telemedicine equipment and developing services in Scotland.

Performance
The Academy of Medical Royal Colleges and Faculties in Scotland produced a report entitled “Learning from serious failings in care” in July 2015. The investigation was launched after scandals in the health service in 2013 and 2014 leading to concerns about patient safety and care at the infirmary. They found leadership and accountability were often lacking and bullying was endemic.  The 20 recommendations for improvements in the NHS included a set of minimum safe staffing levels for consultants, doctors, nurses and other staff in hospital settings. They criticised a target driven culture, saying:  "Quality care must become the primary influence on patient experience... and the primary indicator of performance."

References

Hospitals in Aberdeen
NHS Grampian
Teaching hospitals in Scotland
NHS Scotland hospitals
Organisations based in Scotland with royal patronage
1737 establishments in Scotland
Hospitals established in the 1730s